Lee Collin Baxter (born 16 July 1970, Liverpool, England) is a British actor of stage and screen. Graduate from Guildford School of Acting where he won Student of the Year and the annual Choreography Award.

He gained initial success with the half English, half Dutch boy band, Caught In The Act. With fifteen hit singles and selling over 15 million singles and albums, the band went on to win 15 gold and 2 platinum records.

Highlights of his career with the band including performing on Miss World 1995 in Sun City, South Africa, televised to over 90 countries.

After Caught In The Act disbanded, Lee returned to the UK to pursue an acting career under the name of Collin Baxter.

In 2016, Baxter came out as gay.

Selected stage and screen credits

Theatre
Committed Exhibitionist, Gilded Balloon, Edinburgh Festival; The Landor, Broadway Theatre; The Red Lion, London, 2003
Men's Singles,  The English Theatre, Hamburg, 2005
Bully's Paradise, UK Tour, 2006
Visiting Mr. Green,  The English Theatre, Hamburg, 2007
She Stoops to Conquer, Incisor Theatre Co., 2008
Six Dance Lessons in Six Weeks,  The English Theatre, Hamburg, 2009

Filmography

References

External links
Lee Collin Baxter

English pop singers
English male musical theatre actors
1970 births
Living people
English male television actors
English LGBT singers
Gay singers
English expatriates in Germany
Musicians from Liverpool
English gay musicians
English gay actors
21st-century English male singers
21st-century English male actors
20th-century English LGBT people
21st-century English LGBT people